Tangents in Jazz is the second album by American jazz clarinet and saxophone player, composer and arranger Jimmy Giuffre which was released on the Capitol label in 1956.

Reception

Scott Yanow of Allmusic stated, "The music (all but one of the ten numbers are by Giuffre) puts an emphasis on cool tones and relaxed improvising, hinting at folk themes but sounding quite modern for the time".

Track listing 
All compositions by Jimmy Giuffre except as indicated
 "Scintilla I" - 0:53 
 "Finger Snapper" - 2:34
 "Lazy Tones" - 4:10
 "Scintilla II" - 2:27 
 "Chirpin' Time" - 5:47
 "This Is My Beloved" (Vernon Duke) - 3:30  (Vernon Duke)
 "The Leprechaun" - 6:34
 "Scintilla III" - 1:37 
 "Rhetoric" - 3:24
 "Scintilla IV" - 2:52
Recorded at Capitol Studios in Los Angeles, CA on June 6, 1955 (tracks 4-6), June 7, 1955 (tracks 1, 3 & 10) and June 10, 1955 (tracks 2 & 7-9)

Personnel 
Jimmy Giuffre - clarinet, tenor saxophone, baritone saxophone
Jack Sheldon - trumpet
Ralph Peña - bass
Artie Anton - drums

References 

Jimmy Giuffre albums
1956 albums
Capitol Records albums